Raju Narayanaswamy (born 24 May 1968) is an Indian Administrative Service officer and whistleblower. A district collector for five Kerala districts during his career, Narayanaswamy was one of several IAS officers chosen by former chief minister V. S. Achuthanandan to investigate corruption in the state. He was transferred many times during his career, and has been compared to fellow IAS officer and whistleblower Ashok Khemka.

Career 
A 1991 Kerala-cadre officer, Narayanaswamy has held a number of posts and has been repeatedly penalised for exposing corruption. His anti-corruption campaign began early in his career, attracting criticism from political bosses and accolades from the public leading to 20 transfers in 22 years. Narayanaswamy was forced to go on leave as managing director of MarketFed and work for junior officers.

As district collector of Thrissur, he oversaw the widening of Pattalom Road and the Inner Ring Road. Narayanaswamy refused permission to a real-estate developer to fill a large paddy farm, because it would have flooded about 50 poor village homes nearby with waste from an adjacent government hospital.

After the V. S. Achuthanandan-led LDF government came into power in Kerala, Narayanaswamy was appointed collector for Idukki district. When Kerala chief minister  wanted encroachers in Munnar driven out, Narayanaswamy was one of his three handpicked men. Although CPM leaders objected to his choice, Achuthanandan stood his ground.

In 2007, Narayanaswamy inquired into a proposed land deal by the son and daughter of Kerala Public Works minister T. U. Kuruvilla; Kuruvilla was forced to resign after an investigation. Kuruvilla's children had taken ₹65 million from an NRI businessman, promising to sell him land suspected of encroaching. The sale fell through, and the businessman went public; Kuruvilla maintained his innocence. Narayanaswamy, Idukki District Collector, surveyed the land; much was government land, suggesting a violation of the Benami Transactions (Prohibition) Act, 1988, and Kuruvilla resigned. 

Narayanaswamy has also proceeded against former minister P. J. Joseph and his family about alleged illegal landholdings. "In my service life, I have always fought against corruption. We could be sidelined but officers should not get demoralized. The public applause we get for taking a strong stand on issues is what keeps us going", he said. Since 2007, he has been transferred a number of times and been tapped by the Election Commission of India for 34 election positions in 16 states across the country. During the 2012 Uttar Pradesh elections, Narayanaswamy was a roll observer for all six districts in Kanpur division.  Swamy was removed from his post as civil supplies commissioner in Thiruvananthapuram early the following year after he launched an investigation into corruption charges against civil supplies minister Anoop Jacob.

Appointed chairman of the Coconut Development Board in August 2018, he unearthed  corruption involving the CDB's Bangalore regional director and technical officer. Both were investigated and suspended, based on Narayanaswamy's findings. He was transferred on 7 March 2019, after which he went to the Central Administrative Tribunal; where his case is pending. 

He has been district magistrate and collector of five districts in Kerala. Narayanaswamy, who has been compared to fellow whistleblower Ashok Khemka, has been transferred over 20 times in 22 years.

Literary career and awards 
Narayanaswamy has written twenty-six books, including the popular-science book Nano Muthal Nakshatram Vare. He received the 2003 Kerala Sahitya Akademi Award for Travelogue for Santhimantram Muzhangunna Thazvarayil. Narayanaswamy received the Satyendra K. Dubey Memorial Award from IIT Kanpur in 2018 for professional integrity in upholding human values, and was an international observer of the 2018 Zimbabwean general election. In December 2021, he received a Leonardo da Vinci Fellowship from George Mason University to research the prevention of corruption in intellectual property-rights offices with science and technology, including artificial intelligence and blockchain.

See also 

 Sateyendra Dubey
 Shanmugam Manjunath
 
 [https://journals.sagepub.com/action/doSearch?target=default&ContribAuthorStored=Swamy%2C+Raju+Narayana }

References

External links 
 Executive record sheet

1968 births
Living people
Civil Servants from Kerala
District magistrate
IIT Madras alumni
Indian Administrative Service officers from Kerala
Malayali people
People from Thiruvananthapuram district
Vazhappally